This is a list of railway stations in Worcestershire, one of the counties of the United Kingdom. It includes all railway stations in Worcestershire that form part of the British National Rail network that currently have timetabled train services. It does not include stations on heritage railways, except for those stations which are shared with those on the National Rail Network. 

The main operator is West Midlands Railway who run the majority of services in the county. However Great Western Railway operates the Worcester - London service and Chiltern Railways operates services between Kidderminster and London.

The main rail routes in Worcestershire include:
Birmingham to Worcester via Bromsgrove
Birmingham to Worcester via Kidderminster
Cotswold Line 
Cross-City Line

Stations 
The following table lists the name of each station, along with the year it first opened, and the district in which it is situated. The table also shows the train operators who currently serve each station and the final two columns give information on the number of passengers using each station in recent years, as collated by the Office of Rail Regulation, a Government body. The figures are based on ticket sales.

The 2020-21 data has - in most cases - dropped significantly due to the Coronavirus Pandemic and the lockdown lasting from March 2020 - May 2020 in the UK.

See also
 List of railway stations in the West Midlands
 List of railway stations in Merseyside
 List of railway stations in Greater Manchester
 List of railway stations in Wales
 List of London railway stations

References

External links

Worcestershire
 
Railway